Spielwang is a small village within the municipality of Vachendorf in the district of Traunstein in Bavaria, Germany.

It is not far away from the Chiemsee.

References

Traunstein (district)